Carlo Macchini (born 5 May 1996) is an Italian artistic gymnast. At the 2021 World Artistic Gymnastics Championships in Kitakyushu he placed 4th in the Horizontal Bar event final. In 2022 he won the Horizontal Bar event at the 2022 FIG Apparatus World Cup in Cairo. 

In 2020 he joined the Gruppo Sportivo Fiamme Oro, becoming a state police athlete. He also has his own Youtube channel.

Competitive history

References 

Living people
1996 births
Italian male artistic gymnasts
Sportspeople from the Province of Ancona